Greece and Ellinikí Radiofonía Tileórasi (ERT) chose to host a national selection with the winner being chosen by an "expert" jury. Elpida was chosen with "Sokrati" and placed 8th at Eurovision.

Before Eurovision

National final 
The national final took place on 5 February 1979 at the Municipal Theater in Piraeus and was hosted by Vasilis Tsivilikas. The winning song was chosen by a jury of 65 people who awarded each song a mark out of 10.

At Eurovision
"Sokrati" was performed seventh on the night (following Monaco's Laurent Vaguener with "Notre vie c'est la musique" and preceding Switzerland's Peter, Sue and Marc and Pfuri, Gorps & Kniri with "Trödler Und Co"). At the close of voting, it had received 69 points, placing 8th in a field of 19.

Elpida was accompanied on stage by Lia Vissi (who will later represent Cyprus in the Eurovision Song Contest 1985), Polina (who was to represent Greece in the Eurovision Song Contest 1986, but Greece withdrew), Yiannis Samsiaris and Stelios Goulielmos, all four of them being backing vocalists.

It was succeeded as Greek representative at the 1980 Contest by Anna Vissi & The Epikouri with "Autostop".

Voting

References 

1979
Countries in the Eurovision Song Contest 1979
Eurovision